A Volunteer Examiner Coordinator is an organization that has been approved by the Federal Communications Commission for the administration of amateur radio license examinations in the United States. The VEC system is established and outlined in Part 97 of the FCC rules and regulations.

The FCC maintains a list of the accredited VECs.

Although the FCC currently recognizes 14 VECs, the VEC sponsored by the American Radio Relay League oversees about two-thirds of all U.S. amateur radio examinations, and a large portion of the rest are overseen by W5YI-VEC.

See Also 
 Amateur radio licensing in the United States
 American Radio Relay League

Notes

Amateur radio licensing